Diaphus aliciae is a species of lanternfish found in the Indo-Pacific. Along with the South China Sea.

Size

Etymology
The fish is named in honor of American herpetologist Alice Boring (1883–1955), of Yenching University,  Beijing, China.

References

Myctophidae
Taxa named by Henry Weed Fowler
Fish described in 1934